Rodolfo B. Valentino Sr. is a Filipino politician and was the appointee of Philippine President Corazon Aquino to serve as Officer-in-charge of Marikina. He ran for municipal mayor of Marikina in 1988 and served until June 30, 1992. He was succeeded by Bayani Fernando on June 30, 1992.

Biography
Rodolfo Valentino, a dentist by profession and a scion of a shoemaking family, was appointed Officer-in-Charge by Philippine President Corazon Aquino until 1988 when he was elected mayor on his own. He remained mayor until June 30, 1992 when he lost his reelection bid against Bayani "BF" Fernando.

Marikina Mayor
Rodolfo Valentino, who was appointed officer-in-charge following the EDSA Revolution sought to revive the fortunes of the Marikina shoe industry. In fact, he would spend much of his time in office for this purpose keeping him away from his other tasks. His efforts for the shoe industry would take him to Germany, the Soviet Union and China. In Düsseldorf, he was able to get a big order for ladies shoes which was filled by a local consortium led by Joey Enriquez; Figlia Shoes. He went with Trade Secretary Jose Concepcion on a trade mission to Moscow in 1989. On his second trip to Moscow the following year, he was offered a contract to supply one million pairs, which Vietnam, a fellow socialist country, could not fill. But the Russians could pay only in rubles. In his trip to Wuhan in China, Valentino explored the possibility by using rubles for raw materials.

Valentino took the risks of dealing with a socialist country. He had to deal not with businessmen but with government functionaries. When the Soviet Union collapsed in 1991, it was clear on his third visit to Moscow that his agreement with the communist regime could not be implemented.

References

External links
Marikina City History

Living people
Mayors of Marikina
People from Marikina
Year of birth missing (living people)